John James 'Sean' Kelly (born 24 May 1956) is an Irish former professional road bicycle racer, one of the most successful road cyclists of the 1980s, and one of the finest Classics riders of all time. From becoming a professional in 1977 until his retirement in 1994, he won 193  professional races, including nine Monument Classics, Paris–Nice a record seven years consecutively and the first UCI Road World Cup in 1989. Kelly won one Grand Tour, the 1988 Vuelta a España, and four green jerseys in the Tour de France. He achieved multiple victories in the Giro di Lombardia, Milan–San Remo, Paris–Roubaix and Liège–Bastogne–Liège, as well as three runners-up placings in the only Monument he failed to win, the Tour of Flanders. Other victories include the Grand Prix des Nations and stage races, the Critérium International, Tour de Suisse, Tour of the Basque Country and Volta a Catalunya.

Kelly twice won bronze medals (1982, 1989) in the Road World Championships Elite Men's Road Race and finished fifth in 1987, the year compatriot Stephen Roche won gold. When the FICP rankings became established in March 1984, Kelly was the first cyclist to be ranked World No.1, a position he held for a record five consecutive years. By total career ranking points, Kelly is the second-best cyclist of all time after Eddy Merckx. In the 1984 season, Kelly achieved 33 victories.

Early life and amateur career

Kelly is the second son of Jack (John) and Nellie Kelly, a farming family in Curraghduff, County Waterford. He was born at Belleville Maternity Home in Waterford City on 24 May 1956. He was named John James Kelly after his father and was referred to as "Sean" to avoid confusion at home. Seán is the Irish form of John.

For eight years, he was educated, at Crehana National School, County Waterford, to which he travelled with his older brother Joe. The journey from home in Curraghduff to Crehana School was approximately a-mile-and-a-half. Together, both he and Sean cycled to and from school. Joe later recollects: "I suppose we were like most young fellows at that age – walking was too dull." Official records from his days at Crehana National School confirm Kelly's satisfactory attendance. At school, he was exceedingly shy, unsure of himself and felt intellectually outclassed by other pupils in his class. As a result, Kelly retreated into almost total silence. His education ended aged only 13 when he left school to help on the farm at home after his father went to a hospital in Waterford with an ulcer. At 16, he began work as a bricklayer.

In September 1969, a delegation from the newly formed Carrick Wheelers Road Club visited the Christian Brothers Secondary School, where Joe was a student. In Joe's classroom, the representatives from the cycling club encouraged the pupils to join a recently formed schoolboy cycling league. Joe was fascinated. He joined the schoolboy league, began winning races, and joined the Carrick Wheelers Road Club as a new member. In the Kelly household, the pattern was for Joe to do something, and Sean would follow in his footsteps. And so it was, from humble beginnings, Sean soon joined Joe. On Tuesday, 4 August 1970, aged 14, Sean competed in his first race at Kennedy Terrace, Carrickbeg, County Tipperary, part of Carrick-on-Suir. The race was an eight-mile (12.87 km) handicap, which meant the weaker riders started first and the best last. Kelly set off three minutes before the backmarkers, which included his brother Joe. He was still three minutes ahead of the pursuers when the course turned for home after four miles (6.43 km) and more than three minutes in the lead when he crossed the finish line. In July 1972, aged 16, he won the National Junior Road Championships at Banbridge, County Down.

Kelly won the National Junior Road Championships again in 1973. He took a senior cycling license in 1974, passing up the opportunity to bid for a third consecutive National Junior Road title. In 1974, aged only 17, two months short of his eighteenth birthday, Kelly won the Shay Elliott Memorial Race. That season he participated in the Tour of Ireland and the Tour of Scotland and achieved ten victories as a senior competitor while still eligible to race as a junior. In 1975, Kelly successfully defended his title, winning the Shay Elliott Memorial Race for the second time. He won three stages of the 1975 Tour of Ireland and the mountains jersey. Kelly won stage 7 of the 1975 Tour of Britain, beating Swede Bernt Johansson and Polish rider Jan Trybala in a three-way sprint. Johansson became Olympic Road Race Champion in Montreal a year later. Kelly's exploits at the 1975 Tour of Britain caught the eye of a Londoner, John Morris, who had connections with amateur Velo Club Metz in Metz, France. Morris informed Metz of Kelly's potential. In August 1975, Alain Steinhoff, a member of the Metz club, travelled to the World Championships in Belgium, where Kelly was competing in the amateur road race. Steinhoff offered Kelly a place on the amateur team V. C Metz-Woippy. Kelly assured Steinhoff that he would consider the offer and promised to contact the club sometime during the following winter. Club Metz heard nothing from Kelly during the winter because his focus of attention shifted to competing in the Rapport Toer stage race in South Africa as preparation for the 1976 Olympic Games.

In late September 1975, Kelly and two other Irish riders, Pat and Kieron McQuaid went to South Africa to participate in the Rapport Toer stage race in preparation for the 1976 Olympic Games in Montreal, Canada. Because of an international ban on athletes competing in South Africa, as a consequence of a protest against apartheid, the three Irish cyclists and two Scottish, John Curran and Henry Wilbraham, competed as a British team under false names. The squad were called "Mum for Men" and managed by Tommy Shardelow. When the Irish Cycling Federation received news of their escapades in South Africa, Kelly and the McQuaids incurred a seven-month suspension from racing, reduced after an appeal to six months. Kelly and the McQuaids returned to competitive racing at the end of April 1976.

After resuming racing, Kelly won the Tour of the North in Ulster, Ireland and the Cinturón a Mallorca in Mallorca, Spain. He also won one stage at the 1976 Tour of Britain and one at the 1976 Tour of Ireland. On 29 May 1976, Kelly, Pat and Kieron McQuaid, as a consequence of their participation in the Rapport Toer in South Africa, were barred from the 1976 Olympic Games by the International Olympic Committee. It's misinformation that the ban from the Olympics was for life.

 With the dream of competing at the 1976 Olympic Games in Montreal now shattered, Kelly suddenly required an alternative plan for the rest of the summer to fill the gut-wrenching void. He cast his mind back to Velo Club Metz's interest in August 1975 and penned a short letter to them asking what they could offer. He received a swift reply, offering free accommodation, £25 per week and free replacements for cycling equipment impaired during races. Kelly accepted the proposition and travelled to Metz in mid-June 1976. Soon after arriving, his motivation grew when he learned Velo Club Metz had an arrangement that a rider would pocket four francs a kilometre for every race won. During the five months he spent with Velo Club Metz, Kelly was victorious in eighteen of the twenty-five races he started, including his most prestigious win, the Piccolo Giro di Lombardia in Italy.

Kelly's time with Velo Club Metz proved lucrative as he returned home to Ireland £800 richer. The money earned made cycling with Metz worthwhile. He told club officials he would return to V.C Metz-Woippy for the 1977 season. Not long after returning home, Kelly contacted Pat McQuaid, asking if he'd be interested in going to Metz with him. McQuaid immediately agreed to go. In early November 1976, Velo Club Metz flew Kelly and McQuaid to London. Metz sent a delegate to meet them there. With the assistance of the club representative and Londoner John Morris, proposals were accepted, which would cover the two Irish amateurs in Metz for the 1977 season. The bonus scheme offered was substantially better than what Kelly had acquired in his first season with Metz.

During Kelly's stint with Velo Club Metz in the 1976 season, an impressive stage win at the Tour de Haute-Marne in Northeastern France caught the attention of Jean-Pierre Douçot. Douçot, a former amateur cyclist, was a mechanic and talent scout in eastern France. Jean-Pierre informed Jean de Gribaldy, a directeur sportif from Besançon who was putting together a French squad for the Belgian professional team, of Kelly's potential. Later, Kelly's win at the end of the season on 2 October 1976 in the Piccolo Giro di Lombardia left an indelible impression, which convinced de Gribaldy to act upon Douçot's earlier recommendation.

On 9 December 1976, a private jet was flown from Dole Airport, near Besançon and landed at Dublin Airport. Onboard was directeur sportif Jean de Gribaldy, pilot Bernard Dagot and a youthful French amateur cyclist, Noël Converset. Dagot, Chief Air Traffic Controller at Dole Airport, spoke fluent English and his linguistic skills earned him the role of an interpreter. Converset, Kelly's teammate at Metz, was taken to Ireland to identify Kelly and assist in the recruitment process. The three Frenchmen hired a taxi in Dublin to take them to Carrick-on-Suir. Upon arrival in Carrick-on-Suir, they were given directions to Kelly's home in rural Curraghduff. Arriving unexpectedly, Jack and Nellie Kelly greeted them. Sean, who wasn't at home, was out driving a tractor. The trio decided to drive out the Dungarvan road in the hope that they would discover Kelly on his trip back home in the tractor. Soon they encountered a tractor, driven by a young man, travelling towards them. De Gribaldy asked Converset, "Is that Kelly?" to which the uncertain Converset hesitantly answered. De Gribaldy ordered the driver to bring the taxi to a halt. Dagot emerged from the taxi hailing the tractor and asked the driver, "Are you Sean Kelly?" to which the response was, "Yes, "I am Sean Kelly." Both parties agreed to go to Kelly's home in Curraghduff for negotiations. De Gribaldy offered Kelly an annual salary of £4000, which Kelly declined. Kelly consulted Pat McQuaid and Ireland's cycling team manager John Lackey for advice. A week later, de Gribaldy telephoned Kelly, at home in Ireland from Besançon. Kelly successfully negotiated a deal, asking for £6000 in the process, which Gribaldy agreed to. Kelly now had a professional contract with Flandria. Pat's brother Oliver replaced Kelly at Velo Club Metz.

Kelly travelled to France in late January 1977 and lived for two years at 18, Place de la Révolution (formerly, Place du Marché) in Besançon, de Gribaldy's home town. The apartment was above a bike shop owned by de Gribaldy. He shared with four teammates, Noël Converset, Marcel Tinazzi, René Bittinger and Dominique Sanders.

Professional career

Early years
Flandria were a Belgian cycling team sponsored by a Belgian company Flandria, which manufactured bicycles, mopeds and scooters. Guillaume Driessens was the directeur sportif of the Flandria team, one of the world's best, with riders such as Freddy Maertens, Marc Demeyer and Michel Pollentier among their ranks. Flandria required a French squad to expand its commercial interests in France, so they hired Jean de Gribaldy to assemble and direct a new team. The French squad competed predominantly in smaller French races. The Belgian team based in Belgium contained the strongest and most experienced riders. Good performances meant promotion from de Gribaldy's French squad to the Belgian team.

On 7 February 1977, Kelly participated in his first race as a professional competitor, the first stage of the six-day stage race Étoile de Bessèges. He made an impressive debut, finishing tenth in the opening stage and third in the final overall general classification. On 19 February 1977, in the first stage of the Tour Méditerranéen, Kelly was denied his first professional victory. Without the benefit of a photo-finish, the judge at the finish line deemed Jan Raas the winner in a sprint finish, with Kelly given second place. Several years later, a photographer who had captured a photo at the finish line that day met Kelly in southern France, showing him the image which provided emphatic evidence that Kelly was the winner of the stage.

On 6 March 1977, in a six-man sprint finish, Kelly recorded his first win as a professional, the pro-am Grand Prix de Lugano in Switzerland. Kelly's early impressive displays caught the attention of Guillaume Driessens and the Belgian Flandria squad, resulting in Kelly being promoted and selected to compete with their team at the 1977 Paris–Nice as a domestique for Freddy Maertens. Maertens won the opening prologue and defended his leader's jersey throughout the entire race winning overall.

On 19 March 1977, Kelly participated in his first Monument Classic, the Milan–San Remo. On 11 May 1977, competing with the French squad, Kelly won the first stage of the Tour de Romandie in Switzerland and finished tenth overall in the final general classification. On 25 May 1977, Kelly won the French one-day race Circuit de l'Indre, outsprinting Eddy Merckx into second place. In October 1977, Kelly recorded his fourth win of the season, outsprinting Frenchman Serge Périn in the fourth stage of the Étoile des Espoirs.

Kelly stayed with de Gribaldy for 1978. In 1978, he started in the Tour de France, in which he also won a stage. Michel Pollentier was disqualified from the 1978 Tour de France after cheating a drugs test on the afternoon that he took the race lead. He left the team at the end of the season and started his own, with a new backer, Splendor. Both Maertens and Pollentier wanted Kelly. Pollentier and Splendor offered Kelly more and made him a team leader. Kelly and Pollentier often shared hotel rooms. But Splendor was new and logistic problems became obvious. The bikes were in poor state – enough that Splendor decided not to ride Paris–Roubaix – and the manager, Robert Lauwers, was replaced. Kelly rose above it and rode for himself.

Stage successes

By now Kelly had a reputation as a sprinter who could not win stage races, although he did finish fourth in the 1980 Vuelta a España. De Gribaldy employed him as unambiguous team leader, someone he believed could win stage races and not just stages. To this end, de Gribaldy encouraged Kelly to lose weight, convincing the latter that he could target the overall win at Paris–Nice: Kelly won the "Race to the Sun" and four of its stages. On the last of those, a time-trial to the Col d'Èze, he beat Gilbert Duclos-Lassalle and pushed him out of the lead. Years later Kelly admitted that his countryman Roche's emergence during his neo-pro season in 1981, during which he had also won Paris–Nice, was one of the factors which motivated him to adjust his focus to becoming more of an all-round rider. However, the spring classics season proved a disappointment, with Kelly's best result being a 12th place in Paris–Roubaix after suffering multiple punctures. Despite that, that season he went on to win another of objectives set by de Gribaldy: the points classification of the Tour de France, where he took five second places on flat stages before winning a reduced bunch sprint in Pau after climbing the Col d'Aubisque. His points total was nearly three times that of the points classification runner-up, the yellow jersey winner Bernard Hinault. He won bronze in the 1982 Road World Championships Elite Men's Road Race in Goodwood, West Sussex, England, the first world medal for an Irish rider since Shay Elliott's silver in 1962. At the end of the year, Kelly married his girlfriend, Linda Grant, the daughter of a local cycling club official. Carrick-on-Suir named the town square "Sean Kelly Square" in tribute to his achievements in the 1982 Tour de France and his bronze medal at the 1982 World Championships. The following year, 1983, Kelly won Paris–Nice for the second time, the first of three Critérium International victories, his first Tour de Suisse and the points classification in the Tour de France for the second consecutive year. Kelly wore the yellow jersey in the 1983 Tour de France for one day, during the mountainous stage 10 from Pau to Bagnères-de-Luchon, which included the Pyrenean climbs, the Aubisque, Tourmalet, Aspin and Peyresourde. It was the only time he would wear the "maillot jaune" at the Tour.

Kelly confirmed his potential in autumn 1983. A leading group of 18 entered Como in the Giro di Lombardia after a battle over the Intelvi and Schignano passes. Kelly won the sprint to take his first Monument by the narrowest margin, less than half a wheel separating the first four, against cycling greats including Francesco Moser, Adri van der Poel, Hennie Kuiper and World Champion Greg LeMond.

Kelly dominated the following spring. He won Paris–Nice for the third successive time beating Roche as well as the Tour de France winner, Bernard Hinault who was returning after a knee injury. Kelly finished second in Milan–San Remo and the Tour of Flanders, but was unbeatable in Paris–Roubaix and Liège–Bastogne–Liège. The day after Paris–Roubaix, the French daily sports paper, L'Équipe, pictured Kelly cycling the cobbles with mud on his face and had the heading Insatiable Kelly! referring to his appetite for winning that spring. He won all three stages in the Critérium International: the bunch sprint on stage 1, a solo victory in the mountain stage and beating Roche in the final time trial. Kelly achieved 33 victories in 1984. He was becoming a contender in the Grand Tours, as seen by finishing fifth in the Tour de France. This may have caused him to lose his grip on the points classification in that year's Tour. Kelly was wearing it as the Tour was finishing on the Champs-Élysées but lost it in the bunch finish to the Belgian, Frank Hoste, who finished ahead of Kelly gaining points to take the jersey off Kelly's shoulders.

He won Paris–Nice in 1985, again beating Roche. He also took three stage wins at the Vuelta a España, but suffered a frustrating spring classics season, taking a third place at Paris–Roubaix and fourth at Liège–Bastogne–Liège, but losing out on wins through poor tactical decisions, such as at Milan–San Remo where he and rival Eric Vanderaerden marked each other out of contention. He won the points classification for the third time and finished fourth overall in the 1985 Tour de France, where his rivalry with Vanderaerden boiled over at the finish of the sixth stage in Reims: the latter veered to prevent Kelly from coming past in the final sprint, leading Kelly to push Vanderarden, and the Belgian pulling the Irishman's jersey in response. The race saw him battle for the last step on the GC podium with Stephen Roche: although Roche finished the Tour in third position overall, the duo's performances saw interest in the race expanding gradually in the Irish press. Kelly won the first Nissan International Classic beating Adri van der Poel. At the end of the season, he won the Giro di Lombardia.

He won Milan–San Remo in 1986 after winning Paris–Nice. In Milan–San Remo, Kelly was being marked closely by Vanderaerden in the closing stages of the race. Mario Beccia attacked on the race's final climb of the Poggio di San Remo and was followed by Greg LeMond. In order to shake Vanderaerden, Kelly feigned a mechanical problem before sprinting away to join the lead group, and drove hard on the front to prevent Niki Rüttimann, LeMond's team-mate, who had followed Kelly, from linking up with the front group: Kelly won the three-up sprint at the finish. He also took stage wins at the Volta a la Comunitat Valenciana, Critérium International and Three Days of De Panne. He finished second in the Tour of Flanders and won Paris–Roubaix again. According to his autobiography Hunger, Kelly gave his support to Van der Poel in the latter's bid to win Flanders in exchange for the Dutchman's help in the French cobbled Classic. In Flanders, Kelly rode on the front of the leading four man group in the closing stages of the race, which also included Van der Poel, Jean-Philippe Vandenbrande and Steve Bauer: regarding the final sprint, Kelly wrote that "I started my sprint early, and I knew Van der Poel was probably in my wheel as well, but I certainly gave it 100 percent." After Flanders, he flew to Spain to race the Tour of the Basque Country, which he won, before flying north to compete in Paris–Roubaix. Roles were reversed as Kelly followed Van der Poel in latching onto an attack from Ferdi Van Den Haute on a late cobbled secteur to form another four-man group along with Rudy Dhaenens. Van Den Haute attacked again a kilometre from the race finish – which was located away from Roubaix Velodrome for the first time since 1943 – and once again Van der Poel led Kelly out in the sprint, enabling the latter to cross the line first. To date, Kelly is one of only three riders to win the double of Milan–San Remo and Paris–Roubaix in the same year, along with Cyrille van Hauwaert in 1908 and John Degenkolb in 2015. Kelly was engaged in an intense racing schedule, even by contemporary standards, having competed 34 times from the beginning of the season to 1986. He later explained this as partly due to the influence of Jean de Gribaldy, who reasoned that he might as well race if he was going to have to train on his bike if he didn't compete, and because of new sponsor Kas, a Spanish soft drink manufacturer, who were primarily concerned with success in Spain, and uninterested in winning the Classics, meaning Kelly had to compete in both types of races. He finished on a podium in a Grand Tour for the first time when he finished third in the 1986 Vuelta a España, winning two stages along the way. As a result of serious injuries sustained in a crash during the final stage of the 1986 Tour de Suisse, in which he went over a wall on a descent, Kelly missed the 1986 Tour de France. He returned to Ireland and won the Nissan Classic again. His second win in the Nissan came after a duel with Steve Bauer, who took the yellow jersey after Kelly crashed numerous times. Kelly went into the final stage three seconds behind Bauer and took the jersey when he finished third on the stage and won bonus seconds. Kelly took more than 30 victories in total across the 1986 season.

Kelly won Paris–Nice in 1987 on the last day after Roche, the leader, punctured. Later, leading the Vuelta a España with three days to go, he retired with an extremely painful saddle sore. His bad luck continued in the Tour de France, retiring after fracturing his collarbone in a crash. After the 1987 Road World Championships Elite Men's Road Race, in which he finished fifth behind Roche, Kelly returned to Ireland to win the Nissan Classic for the third consecutive time.

Kelly won his seventh consecutive Paris–Nice in the spring of 1988, a record. He won Gent–Wevelgem several weeks later.

Grand Tour success

Kelly returned in April to the 1988 Vuelta a España which started on the rugged mountainous island of Tenerife where his team struggled in the second stage, losing the influential rider Thomas Wegmüller to dysentery and losing further time in the time-trial around Las Palmas. However, on the Spanish mainland, Kelly concentrated on winning sprint time bonuses, battling with sprinter Manuel Jorge Domínguez, the  teammate of leader, Laudelino Cubino.

After regaining a minute in four days, the race reached the mountains where Kelly relied on help from Robert Millar of team  to stay within two minutes of Cubino after the mountain trial to Alto Oviedo. He then finished fourth behind stage-winner Fabio Parra and Anselmo Fuerte on stage 13 to the ski-station at Cerler, cutting a minute and a half into Cubino's lead. From this stage, Fuerte had moved into second overall and later took the jersey from Cubino on the 16th stage to Albacete when the leader got caught on the wrong side of a split caused by cross-winds.

Kelly maintained the gap between himself and Fuerte and started the time trial on the second last day 21 seconds behind. Confident that he could overhaul the leader, he "put it in a big gear and gave it everything." He took the leader's "maillot amarillo" (yellow jersey), beating Fuerte by almost two minutes. The following day Kelly won his only Grand Tour, over West German Raimund Dietzen and also won the points competition. After his Vuelta win Kelly returned to Carrick-on-Suir where a parade was held in his honour.

Twilight of his career
 
Kelly finished 46th overall in the 1988 Tour de France, just over an hour behind winner, Spaniard Pedro Delgado, and later admitted he was no longer a contender for overall victory. He finished third behind the German, Rolf Gölz, in the 1988 Nissan Classic. In 1989, Kelly switched to the Dutch  team and stayed there for three years until the end of the 1991 season. He achieved his first major victory with PDM in 1989, winning the Liège–Bastogne–Liège for the second time. The same year he won the points classification in the Tour de France for the fourth time and the inaugural UCI Road World Cup championship. He won bronze in the sprint finish at the rainy 1989 Road World Championships Elite Men's Road Race in Chambéry, France behind Dimitri Konyshev and winner Greg LeMond.

Kelly won the Tour de Suisse in 1990 for the second time. In March 1991, while competing in the Paris–Nice, he broke his right collarbone. During the 1991 Tour de France, the entire PDM team, including Kelly, abandoned the race, citing illness, which later became known as the "Intralipid Affair." In August 1991, Kelly abandoned his racing schedule to participate in the Tour of Galicia after his brother Joe was tragically killed in the Comeragh 100 near Carrick-on-Suir, County Tipperary. He came back to win his fourth Nissan Classic by four seconds over Sean Yates and went on to win the Giro di Lombardia at the end of the season. 

Kelly won the Giro di Lombardia for a third time in 1991 but started 1992 regarded as past his prime. Race favourite Moreno Argentin attacked from the leading group on the final climb, the Poggio. He broke clear after several attempts and reached the top eight seconds before the rest. It seemed he was on his way to a solo victory as the peloton descended the Poggio, where Maurizio Fondriest led, marked by Argentin's teammate Rolf Sørensen. Kelly was behind these two in third position. Kelly attacked with three kilometres of descending left. Sorensen could not hold his acceleration and Kelly got away. He caught Argentin with a kilometre to go. Both stalled, the chasers closing fast, Argentin gesturing to Kelly to take the front. Kelly stayed on Argentin's wheel. The two moved again, preparing for a sprint; Kelly launched himself and in the final 200m came past Argentin to win his final Classic.

Kelly's first appearance and sole participation in the Giro d'Italia was in 1992. His team, Lotus–Festina, was offered a wild card entry under the condition that Kelly was, included in their starting team. He pulled out of the race after stage 16 from Palazzolo sull’Oglio to Sondrio, later admitting his intention of not completing the Giro and his agreement with his directeur sportif that he would withdraw at some stage.

In 1992, Kelly travelled to Colombia for the Clásico RCN, where he won the second stage. His former PDM teammate, Martin Earley, pushed him into second place at the 1994 Irish National Road Championships.

Kelly's last year as a professional was 1994, when he rode for Catavana. He returned to Carrick-on-Suir at the end of the season to ride the annual Hamper race. That was Kelly's last race as a professional. Eddy Merckx, Laurent Fignon, Bernard Hinault, Roger De Vlaeminck, Claude Criquielion, Stephen Roche, Martin Earley, Acácio da Silva and Paul Kimmage were among 1,200 cyclists present. The President of Ireland, Mary Robinson, attended a civic presentation to Kelly the day before the race. Kelly won in a sprint against Roche. Kelly won this race again six years later.

Legacy and riding style

Kelly's career spanned the eras of several legends of the Tour de France, from Eddy Merckx through to Miguel Induráin. His first Tour was also the first for Bernard Hinault and the two battled in the sprint of stage 15. Greg LeMond and Laurent Fignon emerged in the early eighties and challenged Kelly in the Classics as well as in the Tour, and Kelly witnessed the rise of Miguel Induráin and the early career of Lance Armstrong. Kelly's career coincided with Stephen Roche as well as Classics specialists including Francesco Moser, Claude Criquielion, Moreno Argentin and Eric Vanderaerden. Evidence of Kelly's dominance can be seen from his three victories in the season-long Super Prestige Pernod International competition (predecessor to the World Cup). Kelly competed throughout the season, from Paris–Nice in March to the Giro di Lombardia in October, winning both in 1983 and 1985.

While some sprinters remain sheltered in the peloton until the final few hundred metres, Kelly could instigate breaks and climb well, proving this by winning the Vuelta a España in 1988, as well as winning a stage of Paris–Nice on the climb of Mont Ventoux.  His victories in Paris–Roubaix (1984, 1986) showed his ability in poor weather and on pavé sections, while he could stay with the climbing specialists in the mountains in the Tour de France. He was also a formidable descender, clocking a career top race speed of 124 km/h (77 mi/h), while descending from Col de Joux Plane to Morzine on stage 19 of the Tour in 1984. He finished fourth in the Tour in 1985 and won the points classification in 1982, 1983, 1985, and 1989, the first to win four times, a feat he repeated in the Vuelta a España. Kelly won five stages in the Tour de France and 16 in the Vuelta a España.

Kelly was also an outstanding time trialist. In the inaugural 1985 Nissan Classic, Kelly, wearing a skinsuit, racing a Vitus Plus Carbone road bike with drop handlebars and a rear Mavic disc wheel, produced a magnificent performance in the stage 3a, 21 km (13.04 mi) individual time trial from Carrick-on-Suir to Clonmel. His winning time of 24:09 was 49 seconds quicker than second-placed Stephen Roche. Kelly's winning average speed of 52.173 km/h (32.419 mi/h) was faster than any individual had ever accomplished in a time trial, further than 20 km. It took another four years to surpass this record when Dutchman Jelle Nijdam averaged 52.375 km/h (32.544 mi/h) in the historical 24.5 km (15.22 mi) individual time trial from Versailles to Paris at the 1989 Tour de France.

Doping
Kelly failed drug tests twice during his career. After the 1984 edition of Paris–Brussels, in which he had finished third, cycling authorities stated that a urine sample supplied by Kelly had tested positive for pemoline (Stimul), a result which was repeated with the testing of a B sample. The Royal Belgian Cycling League sentenced Kelly to a three-month suspended ban and a fine. Kelly denied taking any banned substances: in an interview at the time with David Walsh, he claimed that there were "irregularities at the testing centre that day ... the medical control at Paris-Brussels was very badly organised and lots of people were in the room who had no right to be there ... in all this confusion something must have gone wrong". In his autobiography Hunger, Kelly stated that Irish Cycling Federation official Karl McCarthy, who acted as a witness on Kelly's behalf at the second test as he was unable to attend due to racing commitments, told him that the B sample was "tiny" and below the amount required for the test. In his book Massacre à la chaîne: Révélations sur 30 ans de tricheries (Chain massacre: Revelations on 30 years of cheating), Kelly's former soigneur Willy Voet claimed that Kelly had been ill with bronchitis in the week before the race and had taken ephedrine to treat it: to avoid a positive test, Voet wrote that Kelly had carried a container in his shorts filled with urine supplied by one of the team's mechanics to doping control, and that the Stimul detected in the sample had been taken by the mechanic to help him stay awake while driving the team's truck.

Kelly's second positive test occurred at the 1988 Tour of the Basque Country, where he tested positive for codeine. Having finished fourth in the overall classification, he received a ten-minute penalty that dropped him down the order. Kelly explained this as being the result of a worsening cough he had developed during the race: he said that between the end of the final stage and attending doping control he took a swig from a bottle of cough medicine, to which he attributed the presence of codeine in his urine sample.

Post-cycling career
Kelly is a commentator for the English-language services of Eurosport where he has been described as the Rolls-Royce of commentators. He is known for giving great insight into races and typically commentates on all the big races including the Tour de France, Giro d'Italia and the Vuelta a España.

He has established and is involved in the Sean Kelly Cycling Academy in Belgium. In 2006 he launched Ireland's first professional team, the  team, composed of young Irish and Belgian riders based at the Sean Kelly Cycling Academy in Merchtem, Belgium. He has a cycling clothing company which supplies clubs and companies, and which also organises corporate cycling events in Ireland and throughout Europe. He rides long-distance charity cycling tours with Blazing Saddles, a charity raising money for the blind and partially sighted. Such tours have included a journey across America by bike in 2000. He also participates in charity cycling endurance events in Scotland (notably with the Braveheart Cycling Fund), England, France and Ireland. Sean Kelly regularly cycles with SportActive cycling holidays in Mallorca.

The inaugural Sean Kelly Tour of Waterford was held on 19 August 2007. Kelly was one of the 910 participants. The second was on 24 August 2008. Kelly was one of the 2,048. The 2009 Tour went ahead on 30 August 2009. It attracted over 3,400 participants. On 29 August 2010, 3708 cyclists took part in the Tour. In 2011 the attendance ballooned to over 8,000 over the two days and  events.  This ran annually until 2017. In 2018, the organisers of The Sean Kelly Tour of Waterford completed a review and decided not to run the event and to look at other cycling initiatives in and around Waterford.

Personality
Fellow pupils at Kelly's school [see above] felt Kelly fell silent because he felt intellectually outclassed.

The lack of words continued even after Kelly had proved himself one of the best racing cyclists of his era.

Coverage
Kelly is the subject of several books, including KELLY A Biography of Sean Kelly by David Walsh in 1986 and SEAN KELLY a man for all seasons by Sean Kelly and David Walsh in 1991.

Sean Kelly published his autobiography Hunger in 2013.

Awards
In December 1986, Sean Kelly won the RTÉ Sports Person of the Year Award. In December 2005, he received the Mick Doyle Golden Memory Award at the Canon Hayes National Sports Awards in Aherlow, County Tipperary. In November 2013, at Dublin City University, he was awarded an Honorary Doctorate in Philosophy in recognition of his contribution to Irish sport. In November 2019, he received a lifetime achievement award at the Cycling Weekly Awards in London.

Career achievements

Major results
Sources:

Amateur
1972
 1st  Road race, National Junior Road Championships
1973
 1st  Road race, National Junior Road Championships
1974 
 1st Shay Elliott Memorial Race
1975 
 Tour of Ireland
1st Mountains classification
1st Stages 5, 6 & 7
 1st Stage 7 Milk Race
 1st Shay Elliott Memorial Race
 8th Manx Trophy
1976
 1st  Overall Cinturón a Mallorca
 1st  Overall The Tour of the North
 1st Piccolo Giro di Lombardia
 1st Stage 6 Tour of Ireland
 1st Stage 6 Milk Race
Professional
1977
 1st GP Lugano
 1st Circuit de l'Indre
 Étoile des Espoirs
 1st Stage 4 
 2nd Overall Ronde van Nederland
 3rd Overall Étoile de Bessèges
 3rd Omloop van het Houtland
 4th Circuit des Frontières
 10th Overall Grand Prix du Midi Libre
 9th Ronde van Midden-Zeeland
 10th Overall Tour de Romandie
 1st Stage 1 
1978
 1st Stage 6 Tour de France
 1st Stages 1a (TTT) & 1b Setmana Catalana de Ciclismo
 1st Stage 3 Tour Méditerranéen
 1st Stage 5a Étoile des Espoirs
1979
 Vuelta a España
1st Stages 1 & 8a
 1st Grand Prix de Cannes
 9th Road race, UCI Road World Championships
 10th Omloop Het Volk
1980
 1st  Overall Three Days of De Panne
1st Stage 2
 Tour de France
1st Stages 19 & 21
 1st Stage 3a Critérium du Dauphiné Libéré
 1st Stage 4 Ronde van Nederland
 2nd E3 Prijs Vlaanderen
 2nd De Brabantse Pijl
 2nd Tour du Haut Var
 3rd Amstel Gold Race
 3rd Omloop Het Volk
 3rd Kuurne–Brussels–Kuurne
 4th Overall Vuelta a España
1st  Points classification
1st Sprints classification
1st Stages 1, 2, 14, 17 & 19
 4th Milan–San Remo
1981
 1st Stage 15 Tour de France
 1st Stage 2 Critérium du Dauphiné Libéré
 1st Stage 5a Ronde van Nederland
 1st Stage 3 Tour of Belgium
 1st Stage 1 Tour of Luxembourg
 2nd Overall Four Days of Dunkirk
1st Stage 2
 4th La Flèche Wallonne
 5th Rund um den Henninger Turm
 6th Amstel Gold Race
 7th De Brabantse Pijl
 8th Tour of Flanders
 9th Züri–Metzgete
1982
 1st  Overall Paris–Nice
1st Stages 3, 5, 7a & 7b (ITT)
 Étoile des Espoirs
1st Stages 1 & 3
 1st Tour du Haut Var
 1st Stage 2 Grand Prix du Midi Libre
 1st Stage 3 Critérium International
 Tour de France
1st  Points classification
1st Intermediate Sprints classification
1st Stage 12
 3rd  Road race, UCI Road World Championships
 3rd Omloop Het Volk
 3rd Kuurne–Brussels–Kuurne
 3rd Rund um den Henninger Turm
 4th Amstel Gold Race
 6th GP Ouest–France
 7th Overall Tour de l'Aude
1st Stages 1 & 2
 8th La Flèche Wallonne
 10th Liège–Bastogne–Liège
1983
 1st  Overall Paris–Nice
1st Stages 3a, 4 & 7b (ITT)
 1st  Overall Tour de Suisse
1st  Points classification
1st Stages 3 & 5b (ITT)
 1st  Overall Critérium International
1st Stage 3
 1st Giro di Lombardia
 1st Grand Prix d'Isbergues
 1st Stage 4 Étoile des Espoirs
 1st Stage 2 Paris–Bourges
 2nd Overall Super Prestige Pernod International
 2nd Kuurne–Brussels–Kuurne
 2nd Giro del Piemonte
 5th Milan–San Remo
 6th Trofeo Baracchi
 7th Overall Tour de France
1st  Points classification
1st Intermediate Sprints classification
Held  after Stage 9
 8th Road race, UCI Road World Championships
1984
 1st  Overall Paris–Nice
1st Stages 2 & 7b (ITT)
 1st  Overall Volta a Catalunya
1st  Points classification
1st  Mountains classification
1st Stages 1, 4a, 4b & 7a (ITT)
 1st  Overall Tour of the Basque Country
 1st Stages 1, 3 & 5b (ITT)
 1st  Overall Critérium International
1st Stages 1, 2 & 3 (ITT)
 1st Overall Super Prestige Pernod International
 1st Criterium Stuttgart
 1st Criterium Bussières
 1st Criterium Elsloo
 1st Criterium Manchester 
 1st Profronde van Almelo
 1st Paris–Roubaix
 1st Liège–Bastogne–Liège
 1st Paris–Tours
 1st Paris–Bourges
 1st GP Ouest–France
 1st Grand Prix d'Aix-en-Provence
 1st Critérium des As
 1st Tour de Berne
 2nd Tour of Flanders
 2nd Milan–San Remo
 2nd Grand Prix des Nations
 3rd Grand Prix d'Isbergues
 3rd Eschborn–Frankfurt
 3rd Rund um den Henninger Turm
 4th Overall Tour de Suisse
1st  Points classification
1st Stage 1
 4th Overall Tour du Limousin
1st Stages 1b, 2 & 4
 5th Overall Tour de France
 6th Trofeo Baracchi (with Stephen Roche)
 9th Overall La Méditerranéenne
1985
 1st  Overall Paris–Nice
 1st  Overall Nissan Classic
1st Stages 1 & 3a (ITT)
 Tour of the Basque Country
1st Stages 3 & 5b (ITT)
 1st Overall Super Prestige Pernod International
 1st Giro di Lombardia
 1st Critérium des As
 1st Stage 3 Ronde van Nederland
 2nd Overall Volta a Catalunya
1st Stage 2
 2nd Overall Three Days of De Panne
 3rd Overall Critérium International
1st Stage 1
 3rd Overall Vuelta Ciclista a la Communidad Valenciana 
1st Stage 5
 3rd Paris–Roubaix
 4th Overall Tour de France
1st  Points classification
 4th Overall Tour de Suisse
 4th Liège–Bastogne–Liège
 6th Overall Tour of the Basque Country
 7th Milan–San Remo
 7th Gent–Wevelgem
 9th Overall Vuelta a España
1st  Points classification
1st Stages 2, 10 & 15
1986
 1st  Overall Paris–Nice
1st Prologue, Stages 3 & 7b (ITT)
 1st  Overall Volta a Catalunya
1st  Points classification
1st Stage 7 (ITT)
 1st  Overall Tour of the Basque Country
1st Stages 3, 5a & 5b (ITT)
 1st  Overall Nissan Classic
 Vuelta Ciclista a la Communidad Valenciana
1st Stages 1 & 3
 1st Overall Super Prestige Pernod International
 1st Milan–San Remo
 1st Paris–Roubaix
 1st Grand Prix des Nations
 1st Critérium des As
 1st Stage 4a Vuelta a Aragón
 1st Stage 4 Tour du Limousin
 2nd Overall Critérium International
1st Stages 1 & 3 (ITT)
 2nd Overall Three Days of De Panne
1st Stage 1b (ITT)
 2nd Overall Paris–Bourges
1st Stage 2
 2nd Tour of Flanders
 2nd Giro di Lombardia
 2nd GP Ouest–France
 2nd Brussels Cycling Classic 
 3rd Overall Vuelta a España
1st  Points classification
1st  Combination classification
1st Stages 10 & 13
 5th La Flèche Wallonne
 5th Road race, UCI Road World Championships
 6th Paris–Tours
1987
 1st  Overall Paris–Nice
1st Stage 3
 1st  Overall Tour of the Basque Country
1st  Points classification
1st  Mountains classification
1st Stages 4 & 5b (ITT)
 1st  Overall Critérium International
1st Stages 2 & 3 (ITT)
 1st  Overall Nissan Classic
 Vuelta a España
1st Stages 1 & 3
Held  after Stages 1–4
 1st Stage 7 Vuelta Ciclista a la Communidad Valenciana
 2nd Overall Three Days of De Panne
1st Stage 1b (ITT)
 2nd Overall Super Prestige Pernod International
 2nd Tour of Flanders
 3rd Dwars door België
 4th Milan–San Remo
 4th Brussels Cycling Classic
 4th Grand Prix des Nations
 5th Overall Volta a Catalunya
1st  Points classification
1st Prologue & Stage 1
 5th Road race, UCI Road World Championships
 10th GP Ouest–France
1988
 1st  Overall Vuelta a España
1st  Points classification
1st  Combination classification
1st Stages 10 & 19 (ITT)
 1st  Overall Paris–Nice
1st Stage 6b (ITT)
 1st Overall Setmana Catalana de Ciclisme
1st  Points classification
1st Stage 4b (ITT)
 Tour du Limousin
1st Stages 2b & 3
 1st Gent–Wevelgem
 1st Stage 4 Tour of the Basque Country
 2nd Tour du Haut Var
 2nd Grand Prix de Fourmies
 3rd Overall Kellogg's Tour
 3rd Paris–Tours
 4th Tour of Flanders
 5th Milan–San Remo
 5th Liège–Bastogne–Liège
 7th Omloop Het Volk
1989
 1st  UCI Road World Cup
 1st Liège–Bastogne–Liège
 1st Stage 4 Critérium du Dauphiné Libéré
 1st  Mountains classification Nissan Classic
 2nd Omloop Het Volk
 3rd  Road race, UCI Road World Championships
 3rd Wincanton Classic
 3rd Trofeo Baracchi
 5th Milan–San Remo
 7th Overall Tirreno–Adriatico
 7th Paris–Tours
 9th Overall Tour de France
1st  Points classification
1st  Intermediate sprints classification
1990
 1st  Overall Tour de Suisse
 1st  Points classification
1st Stage 4 
 1st Grand Prix de la Libération (TTT)
 3rd UCI Road World Cup
 3rd Clásica de San Sebastián
 5th Road race, UCI Road World Championships
 6th Overall Tirreno–Adriatico
 8th Overall Critérium International
 8th Paris–Tours
 8th Trofeo Luis Puig
 9th Overall Volta a Catalunya
 10th Overall Nissan Classic
 10th Giro di Lombardia
1991
 1st  Overall Nissan Classic
 1st Giro di Lombardia
 4th Milano–Torino
 4th Trofeo Luis Puig
 9th Overall Volta a la Comunitat Valenciana
1992
 1st Milan–San Remo
 1st Trofeo Luis Puig
 1st Stage 7 Tour de Suisse
 1st Stage 4 Volta a la Comunitat Valenciana
 1st Stage 2 Clásico RCN
 4th Kuurne–Brussels–Kuurne
1993
 1st Criterium Ulvenhout
 4th Paris–Tours
 6th Paris–Bourges
 9th Amsterdam Derny Race
1994
 2nd Road race, National Road Championships
 4th Grand Prix de Wallonie
 6th Overall Tour d'Armorique
 10th Overall Route du Sud

Grand Tour and major stage race general classification results timeline

Sources:

Monuments results timeline

Sources:

Major championships results timeline

Sources:

See also

 Irish cyclists
 Yellow jersey statistics
 List of doping cases in cycling

Notes and references

Footnotes

References

Bibliography

External links

1956 births
Living people
Sportspeople from County Waterford
Irish male cyclists
Irish female cyclists
Irish Tour de France stage winners
Irish expatriate sportspeople in Belgium
Sports commentators
Vuelta a España winners
Irish Vuelta a España stage winners
Cycling announcers
Tour de Suisse stage winners
RTÉ Sports Person of the Year winners
Super Prestige Pernod winners
UCI Road World Rankings winners
UCI Road World Cup winners